Nousseviller-lès-Bitche (literally Nousseviller near Bitche; ; Lorraine Franconian: Nusswiller) is a commune in the Moselle department of the Grand Est administrative region in north-eastern France.

The village belongs to the Pays de Bitche and to the Northern Vosges Regional Nature Park.

See also
 Communes of the Moselle department

References

External links

 Village website

Communes of Moselle (department)
Moselle communes articles needing translation from French Wikipedia